Persoonia hexagona is a species of flowering plant in the family Proteaceae and is endemic to the south-west of Western Australia.

Description
Flowering occurs from November to December and the fruit is a smooth drupe.

Taxonomy
Persoonia hexagona was first formally described in 1994 by Peter Weston in the journal Telopea from specimens he collected north-east of Perenjori in 1980.

Distribution and habitat
This geebung usually grows in Acacia woodland and occurs from near the Murchison River to near Perenjori, in the Avon Wheatbelt, Geraldton Sandplains and Yalgoo biogeographic regions.

Conservation status
This species is classified as "not threatened" by the Western Australian Government Department of Parks and Wildlife.

References

hexagona
Flora of Western Australia
Plants described in 1994
Taxa named by Peter H. Weston